Ilia II, also transliterated as Ilya or Elijah (born 4 January 1933), is the Catholicos-Patriarch of All Georgia and the spiritual leader of the Georgian Orthodox Church. He is officially styled as Catholicos-Patriarch of All Georgia, the Archbishop of Mtskheta-Tbilisi and Metropolitan Bishop of Bichvinta and Tskhum-Abkhazia, His Holiness and Beatitude Ilia II.

Biography
Ilia II was born as Irakli Ghudushauri-Shiolashvili in Ordzhonikidze, Soviet Russia's North Ossetia. His parents came from Georgia, particularly, the Kazbegi district; his father, Giorgi Shiolashvili, was from the village Sno, and his mother, Natalia Kobaidze, from the village Sioni. The Shiolashvili were an influential clan in the highlands of Khevi.

Irakli Ghudushauri graduated from the Moscow Theological Seminary and was ordained, under the name of Ilia, a hierodeacon in 1957 and hieromonk in 1959; he graduated from the Moscow Theological Academy in 1960 and returned to Georgia, where he was assigned to the Batumi Cathedral Church as a priest. In 1961, he was promoted to hegumen and later to archimandrite. On 26 August 1963, he was chosen to be the bishop of Batumi and Shemokmedi and appointed a patriarchal vicar. From 1963 to 1972 he was also the first rector of the Mtskheta Theological Seminary—the only clerical school in Georgia at that time.

In 1967, Ilia was consecrated as the bishop of Tskhumi and Abkhazeti and elevated to the rank of metropolitan in 1969. After the death of the controversial Patriarch David V, he was elected the new Catholicos-Patriarch of Georgia on 25 December 1977.

The new patriarch began a course of reforms, enabling the Georgian Orthodox Church, once suppressed by the Soviet ideology, to largely regain its former influence and prestige by the late 1980s. In 1988 there were 180 priests, 40 monks, and 15 nuns for a congregation variously estimated as being from one to three million. There were 200 churches, one seminary, three convents, and four monasteries. During the last years of the Soviet Union, he was actively involved in Georgia's social life.

The patriarch oversaw the publication of a linguistically updated, modern Georgian version of the Bible, which was printed in the Gorbachev era.

The patriarch joined the people demonstrating in Tbilisi against the Soviet rule on 9 April 1989, and fruitlessly urged the protesters to withdraw to the nearby Kashueti Church to avoid the bloodshed. This peaceful demonstration was dispersed by the Soviet troops, leaving behind 22 dead and hundreds injured. During the civil war in Georgia in the 1990s, he called the rival parties to find a peaceful solution to the crisis.

From 1978 to 1983, Ilia II was co-president of the World Council of Churches (WCC), an ecumenical organization the Georgian Orthodox Church had joined with other Soviet churches in 1962. In May 1997, a vocal group of conservative Orthodox clerics accused Ilia II of participating in "ecumenical heresy" and threatened schism. The patriarch hastily convened the Holy Synod and announced withdrawal from the WCC. In 2002, the then-president of Georgia Eduard Shevardnadze and Ilia II signed a concordat whereby the Georgian Orthodox Church was granted a number of privileges, and holders of the office of patriarch were given legal immunity.

Awards and recognition

As patriarch, he has received the highest Church awards from the Patriarchs of the Orthodox Churches of Antioch, Jerusalem, Alexandria, Russia, Greece, Bulgaria, Romania and almost all other Orthodox Churches. As a productive theologian and church historian, he was conferred an Honorary Doctorate of Theology from St. Vladimir's Orthodox Theological Seminary in New York (1986), the Academy of Sciences in Crete (1997) and the St. Tikhon's Orthodox Theological Seminary in Pennsylvania (1998). Ilia II is an Honorary Academician of the Georgian Academy of Sciences (2003) and Hon. Fellow of the American School of Genealogy, Heraldry and Documentary Sciences. In February 2008, his grace was awarded the David Guramishvili Prize. For its supporting views regarding the monarchical restoration of the House of Bagration in Georgia, Patriarch Ilia II received the Grand Collar of the Order of the Eagle of Georgia from Prince David Bagration of Mukhrani.

Views on constitutional monarchy
Ilia II has a reputation as a proponent of constitutional monarchy as a form of government for Georgia. On 7 October 2007, he publicly called in a sermon for consideration of establishing a constitutional monarchy under the Bagrationi dynasty (which the Russian Empire had dispossessed of the Georgian crown early in the 19th century). The call coincided with rising confrontation between the government of President Mikheil Saakashvili and the opposition, many members of which welcomed the patriarch's proposal. Ilia II favored the ancient house of Prince David Bagration of Mukhrani, and initiated a marriage between this genealogically senior royal line with the Gruzinsky branch. 

He later personally baptized the offspring of this union, Prince Giorgi Bagration Mukhrani, his Godson, styling him "Prince of Georgia" in a ceremony including the whole Synod. In June 2018 he gave an official blessing and performed the wedding ceremony for Prince Juan de Bagration-Mukhrani and Kristine Dzidziguri at Svetitskhoveli Cathedral.

Ilia II and Russia
During the August 2008 Russo-Georgian War, Ilia II appealed to the Russian political leadership and the church, expressing concerns that "the Orthodox Russians were bombing Orthodox Georgians". He also made a pastoral visit, bringing food and aid, to the Russian-occupied central Georgian city of Gori and the surrounding villages which were at the verge of humanitarian catastrophe. He also helped retrieve bodies of deceased Georgian soldiers and civilians. Ilia II also blessed the September 1, 2008 "Stop Russia" demonstrations, in which tens of thousands organized human chains across Georgia.

In December 2008, Ilia II visited Moscow to pay a final farewell to Russia's late Patriarch Alexy II. On 9 December 2008, he met Russia's President Dmitry Medvedev, which was the first high-level official contact between the two countries since the August war. Later, Ilia II announced that he had some "positive agreements" with Medvedev which needed "careful and diplomatic" follow-up by the politicians.

Initiative to increase Georgia's declining birth rate
In the late 2007, concerned with Georgia's declining birth rate, Ilia II offered to personally baptize any child born to a family that already has at least two children, as long as the new child was to be born after his announcement. He conducts mass baptism ceremonies four times a year. The patriarch's initiative contributed to a national baby boom, as being baptized by the Patriarch is a considerable honour among adherents of the Georgian Orthodox Church. Ilia II has more than 19,000 godchildren.

Approval ratings
Ilia II was called "the most trusted man in Georgia" by CNN in 2010, and had the highest favourability rating among Georgian politicians (94%), according to a November 2013 National Democratic Institute for International Affairs poll.

Views on homosexuality and other issues
In 2013, Ilia II described homosexuality as a "disease" and compared it to drug addiction. He urged the Georgian authorities to stop a gay rights rally planned for Tbilisi on 17 May 2013 to mark International Day Against Homophobia, stating that the rally was a "violation of the majority's rights" and "an insult" to the Georgian tradition. Following his comments, thousands of Georgians, led by Georgian Orthodox priests, took to the streets of Tbilisi to protest the gay rights rally. Due to escalating violence against the rally's participants the rally had to be abandoned and the activists driven in a bus to safety by the police. In his response to the event, Ilia II said he did not endorse violence.

In  his sermons Ilia II has condemned homosexuality, abortion, and demanded television be censored to remove sexual content, has denounced school textbooks for "insufficient patriotism", lectured against what he calls "extreme liberalism" and warned against "pseudo-culture" from abroad. He has opposed attempts to give other confessions equal status under Georgian law and has condemned international educational exchanges and working abroad as "unpatriotic".

See also
 List of heads of the Georgian Orthodox Church

References

External links

 Catholicos-Patriarch of all Georgia 

1933 births
Living people
People from Vladikavkaz
Catholicoses and Patriarchs of Georgia (country)
Eastern Orthodox theologians
Christian Peace Conference members
Monarchists from Georgia (country)
Eastern Orthodox Christians from Georgia (country)
Recipients of the Presidential Order of Excellence
Recipients of the Order of Prince Yaroslav the Wise, 3rd class
Recipients of the Order of Prince Yaroslav the Wise, 1st class